The 14 September 2005 Baghdad bombings were a series of more than a dozen terrorist attacks in the Iraqi capital of Baghdad.

The most deadly bombing occurred when a suicide car bomber detonated his vehicle in a crowd of construction workers who had gathered in Baghdad's Oruba Square looking for jobs. The attack, which occurred in the mainly Shia district of Kadhimiya, killed 112 people, and injured 160.

The al-Qaeda in Iraq group claimed that the bombing was in retaliation for a recent offensive against the Iraqi insurgency, but the group's leader Abu Musab al-Zarqawi released an audio tape on the same day declaring war against the Shiites in Iraq so a sectarian motive for the bombing is possible.

References

External links

Scores killed in Baghdad attacks, BBC News, 14 September 2005
Another wave of bombings hit Iraq, International Herald Tribune, 15 September 2005

2005 murders in Iraq
21st-century mass murder in Iraq
Terrorist incidents in Iraq in 2005
Terrorist incidents in Baghdad
Mass murder in 2005
Suicide car and truck bombings in Iraq
Suicide bombings in Baghdad
2000s in Baghdad
September 2005 events in Iraq
Mass murder in Baghdad